The women's luge at the 2002 Winter Olympics began on 12 February,  and was completed on 13 February at Cesana Pariol.

Results
Runs 1 and 2 were held on 12 February, and runs 3 and 4 on 13 February. The German women sweep the podium in the sport for the fifth time in history.

References

External links
2002 luge women's singles results

Luge at the 2002 Winter Olympics
2002 in women's sport
Women's events at the 2002 Winter Olympics